Nguzo was a political party in the Comoros.

History
The party received 2.7% of the vote in the 1992 parliamentary elections, gaining representation in the Assembly of the Union. Nguzo spokesman Mohamed Djimbanaou, later Ambassador to France, was elected to the Assembly for the party.

References

Defunct political parties in the Comoros